Frank James Fiddes (July 16, 1906 – March 26, 1981) was a Canadian rower, born in Toronto, who competed in the 1928 Summer Olympics.

In 1928 he won the bronze medal as member of the Canadian boat in the eights competition.

External links
Frank Fiddes' profile at databaseOlympics

1906 births
1981 deaths
Rowers from Toronto
Canadian male rowers
Olympic bronze medalists for Canada
Olympic rowers of Canada
Rowers at the 1928 Summer Olympics
Olympic medalists in rowing
Medalists at the 1928 Summer Olympics
20th-century Canadian people